Stefan Savić (born 10 January 1994) is a former Serbian professional footballer who played as a defender.

References

External links
 
 Stefan Savić stats at utakmica.rs

1994 births
Living people
Sportspeople from Čačak
Association football defenders
Serbian footballers
FK BSK Borča players
FK Novi Pazar players
FK Partizan players
FK Sloga Petrovac na Mlavi players
FK Dinamo Pančevo players
Serbia youth international footballers
Serbian First League players
Serbian SuperLiga players